Marina Salandy-Brown FRSA, Hon. FRSL, is a Trinidadian journalist, broadcaster and cultural activist. She was formerly an editor and Senior Manager in Radio and News and Current Affairs programmes with the British Broadcasting Corporation (BBC) in London, one of the BBC's few top executives from an ethnic minority background. She is the founder and inaugural director of the NGC Bocas Lit Fest, held annually in Trinidad and Tobago since 2011, "the biggest literary festival in the Anglophone Caribbean", and of the OCM Bocas Prize for Caribbean Literature. She was also co-founder of the Hollick Arvon Caribbean Writers Prize. 

In 2020, Salandy-Brown received the Ferdinand Magellan Award from Chile, and was elected an Honorary Fellow of the United Kingdom's Royal Society of Literature. In 2022, she received the Hummingbird Silver Medal at the National Awards ceremony in Port of Spain, Trinidad.

Biography
She was born Marina Salandy in Diego Martin, Trinidad, and has said: "[A]ll Salandys apparently started there, but I come from everywhere in Trinidad. Although I was a town girl, my father ran government experimental (agricultural) stations and we were lucky enough to also live all over rural Trinidad. I lived in Maracas, St Joseph, when you had to go down into the river five times before getting to our house at the end of the road. When we lived in Matelot, the road wasn't properly paved." She attended the government secondary school in Diego Martin.

Career in Britain
At the age of 17, Salandy-Brown left Trinidad and migrated to Britain to attend university. In London, she began her working life in publishing as an editor with the Melrose Press, after which she was for more than 20 years an editor and senior manager in BBC Radio and News and Current Affairs programmes.

Among the BBC radio programmes she produced was BBC Radio 4's Start the Week, presented by Melvyn Bragg. Bragg recalled the beginning of their successful long-term collaboration: "I met this producer Marina Salandy-Brown and neither she nor I wanted to go on doing the same Start the Week. I remember we had lunch together – and I said, 'Well, if I'm going to go on I want to do this sort of stuff,' And she said, 'So do I' – or she said it first and I agreed…. And then we just conscientiously, steadily put that into operation and changed the programme." In their new styling of the programme, "The producer, Marina Salandy-Brown, and I introduced scientists, historians and philosophers on to that Monday morning slot, and changed the nature of the programme. A change which I am glad that my successor Jeremy Paxman and his successor Andrew Marr have kept."

Other programmes Salandy-Brown produced for BBC Radio 4 included the series Work Talk (1991–92), presented by Ferdinand Dennis, and Book at Bedtime, a 1993 edition featuring Lawrence Scott's novel Witchbroom, abridged by Margaret Busby.

In the early 1980s, Salandy-Brown was involved with the Black Media Workers' Association (BMWA), a pressure group for better training and employment opportunities for black workers in the mainstream press and broadcasting, and in 1982 she conducted research that was the basis for the BMWA report Black Workers in the Media.

As Home Editor of BBC Radio 5 Live, Salandy-Brown was concerned with implementing a diversity policy, arguing in 2002 that "there is no point having diverse people if you don’t allow them to be diverse". She explained the context: "When I joined the BBC in 1984 there were no people of colour working in radio production in the four national domestic services, except one producer from India.... On BBC TV there was one Caribbean woman news presenter, Moira Stuart.... I was determined not to be the first and last Caribbean person to be a BBC radio producer. I immediately started making programmes about people whose voices were never heard by the British public.

I made programmes that promoted Caribbean and developing country cultures, politics and people.... The programmes won prizes and proved that there was a world of stories out there to be told and that all people could be included in the BBC without outraging the British public. They just had to be the very best in quality. I was able to recruit researchers and producers of non-European origin to my production teams.... I also introduced new non-European presenters and subjects to the airwaves. My success paved the way for others to follow as staff members and as presenters....And, even when the argument was won over hiring a work force that represented the population, myopic editors would often pigeon-hole non-white producers and presenters."

Salandy-Brown was a governor of the University of Westminster, a member of the Arts Council Literature panel, and a former trustee of the Koestler Awards to support and fund Arts in prisons in the UK. She is a Fellow of the Royal Society of Arts (FRSA).

Return to Trinidad
Returning to Trinidad in 2004 to be with her mother, Salandy-Brown has since 2005 contributed a weekly commentary column to the Trinidad and Tobago Newsday. She is a consultant to the Trinidad & Tobago Film Company and was formerly Executive Director of the Trinidad and Tobago Film Festival. She also works across the Caribbean as a media consultant.

Salandy-Brown has spoken of her realisation after returning to Trinidad that locally "There was no place for people who read to get together, in a forum to talk about books and there were so many Caribbean writers abroad who had not been to other islands — something was missing." As she stated in 2011: "In Britain there are a hundred and how many literary festivals. Little Dominica, which is so poor and so tiny, has a literary festival. Jamaica had one for 10 years, the Calabash. I think Antigua has one. Why didn't we have one, when we've produced so many great writers? Sam Selvon and these people really made an impact on the world stage. Earl Lovelace is treasured, but not treasured enough, because we don't have prizes. There's been no accolade of Earl's writing since the 1970s. It's important to reward creative effort! We created a literary festival but we also created an international prize for Caribbean writing." So working with a group of like-minded people – including Nicholas Laughlin, Funso Aiyejina, Marjorie Thorpe and Jeremy Taylor – Salandy-Brown launched the Bocas Lit Fest in April 2011, together with the Bocas Prize for Caribbean Literature.

The Bocas Lit Fest celebrated its 10th anniversary in September 2020 with a virtual festival, necessitated by the COVID-19 pandemic.

Writing
As well her weekly column in Newsday, Salandy-Brown has written reviews, articles and essays for other publications both in the Caribbean region and internationally, including Caribbean Beat, The Independent, and elsewhere.

She was a contributor to the book Caribbean Dispatches: Beyond the Tourist Dream (2006), compiled and edited by Jane Bryce, and, more recently, to the 2019 anthology New Daughters of Africa, edited by Margaret Busby.

Awards and recognition

In 1988 Salandy-Brown won the Sony Silver Award for Most Creative Use of Radio, and 1994 she was named Radio Journalist of the Year. She also won Programme of the Year, UK Television and Radio Industries Club, in 1990, and a Sony Gold Award, Best News Programme in 2000 for BBC Radio.

In 1992, she won the New York Festivals Award, Silver.

In 2005, she was awarded an honorary doctorate (DLitt) by the University of Westminster.

In 2012, she was recognised by for her achievements in the Arts in the UK during the last 50 years with an award at the Trinidad and Tobago Independence Jubilee celebrations.

In 2013, she was among six persons to be conferred with honorary doctorates from the University of the West Indies, St Augustine, when in October the Chancellor George A. O. Alleyne presented her with the Doctor of Letters (DLitt), Honoris Causa of the UWI.

In October 2020, an award was conferred on Salandy-Brown marking the 500th anniversary of Ferdinand Magellan's first circumnavigation of the world, in recognition of her work founding the Bocas Lit Fest, promoting art and literature throughout the Caribbean, and exploring other cultures. The inaugural Strait of Magellan Award was presented to her at the Bocas Lit Fest headquarters, Alcazar Street, Port of Spain, on 30 November by Ambassador of Chile Juan Aníbal Barría, who called Salandy-Brown "an explorer like Magellan, who, thanks to her discipline, work and innovation, has managed to build an educational space that crosses the frontiers of knowledge and contributes to the dissemination of the rich Caribbean culture."

Salandy-Brown was elected an Honorary Fellow of the Royal Society of Literature in 2020, the 200th anniversary of its founding.

Alongside the Bocas Lit Fest that she founded, Salandy-Brown was celebrated by the International Women's Forum (IWF) in the "Ideas Remaking the World" segment of IWF's World Leadership Conference in November 2021.

In September 2022, she received the Trinidad national award of the Hummingbird Medal (Silver).

References

External links
 Essiba Small, "Marina Salandy-Brown - Bringing readers & writers together", Trinidad Express Newspapers, 15 March 2013.
 Janine Mendes-Franco, "‘Not Just About Writers': Talking with NGC Bocas Lit Fest Founder", Global Voices, 13 May 2013.
 Shereen Ali, "Marina Salandy-Brown...A determined lobbyist", Sunday Guardian, 10 November 2013.
 "Start Me Up – Honorary Graduand Marina Salandy-Brown", UWI Today.
 "A Q&A with Marina Salandy-Brown, Chair of the 2022 Queen Mary Wasafiri New Writing Prize", Wasafiri, 28 May 2022.

Living people
BBC radio producers
British radio producers
Recipients of the Hummingbird Medal
Trinidad and Tobago broadcasters
Trinidad and Tobago columnists
Trinidad and Tobago journalists
Trinidad and Tobago women columnists
Trinidad and Tobago women journalists
Trinidad and Tobago women writers
Women radio producers
Year of birth missing (living people)